A Norwegian county road ( or ) is a highway in Norway owned and maintained by the local county municipality.  Some of the roads have road signs.  The signs are white with black numbers.

History
In 1931, a system of national roads (Riksvei), county roads (Fylkesvei), and municipal roads (kommunal vei) was established. This accounted for 29.2% of the  public roads in Norway. 

On 1 January 2010, most national roads that were not trunk roads (Stamvei) were transferred to the counties and therefore became county roads. After the reform came into force, there are two types of county roads in Norway—the original (now called secondary) county roads that were not signposted and the new county roads that are numbered (the former national roads).

In 2019 there was a renumbering reform mainly affecting secondary county roads. Those were numbered per county from 1 and up, so that multiple roads in the country could have the same number. In 2019 secondary county roads were mostly given four digit numbers, and some primary county and national road numbers changed, so that every road has a unique number. Secondary county roads still do not have signposted numbers, so car drivers didn't notice so much.

See also
Norwegian national road

References

External links
Veglister 2011 by Statens Vegvesen 

 

sv:Sekundär länsväg